Unity railway station is on the Canadian National Railway mainline in Unity, Saskatchewan.  The station is served by Via Rail's The Canadian as a flag stop (48 hours advance notice required).

References

External links
Via Rail Station Description

Via Rail stations in Saskatchewan
Canadian National Railway stations in Saskatchewan